Sweet pea is a flowering plant.

Sweet Pea may refer to:

Fictional characters
Swee'Pea, a Popeye cartoon character
Sweet Pea, a character from the film Sucker Punch
Sweetpea, a character in The Secret Life of Pets series of films
Sweetpea Sue, a character in Jim Henson's Pajanimals
Sweetpea Beauty, a character in the VeggieTales princess episode of the same name

Nicknames
Sweet Pea, nickname for boxer Pernell Whitaker
Sweet Pea Atkinson, vocalist, former member of pop group Was (Not Was)

Music
Sweet Pea (album), by Tommy Roe (1966)
"Sweet Pea" (song), a 1966 song by singer and songwriter Tommy Roe
"Sweet Pea", a song by singer Amos Lee from his 2006 album Supply and Demand

Films
Sweet Pea (film), international release title of the Italian film Piso pisello
Sweet Pea, a short film by Traci Lords